The 1944 United States presidential election in Alabama took place on November 7, 1944, as part of the 1944 United States presidential election. Alabama voters chose 11 representatives, or electors, to the Electoral College, who voted for president and vice president. In Alabama, voters voted for electors individually instead of as a slate, as in the other states.

Alabama was won in a landslide by incumbent President Franklin D. Roosevelt (D–New York), running with Senator Harry S. Truman, with 81.28 percent of the popular vote, against Governor Thomas E. Dewey (R–New York), running with Governor John W. Bricker, with 18.20 percent of the popular vote, a margin of 63.08 percent. Third-party candidates only managed to pick up 0.53 percent of the vote.

Results

Results by county

See also
United States presidential elections in Alabama

References

Alabama
1944
1944 Alabama elections